CSD Panajachel is a Guatemalan football club from Panajachel, Sololá Department. It currently plays in Segunda División de Ascenso, the third tier of Guatemalan football.

History 
It was founded on 2015 after the other club from Panajachel moved to Coatepeque.

References 

http://fedefutguate.org
https://www.sofascore.com/es/equipo/futbol/panajachel/294821

Football clubs in Guatemala
Association football clubs established in 2015